Pavel Melnikov may refer to:
Pavel Ivanovich Melnikov (1818-1883), Russian writer
Pavel Petrovich Melnikov, Russian engineer
Pavel Melnikov (rower), Russian Olympic rower